Philander C. Knox (1853–1921) was a U.S. Senator from Pennsylvania from 1917 to 1921. Senator Knox may also refer to:

Forrest Knox (born 1956), Kansas State Senate
H. Edward Knox (born 1937), North Carolina State Senate